The Old Indian Defense is a chess opening defined by the moves:

1. d4 Nf6
2. c4 d6

This opening is distinguished from the King's Indian Defense in that Black develops their  on e7 rather than by fianchetto on g7. Mikhail Chigorin pioneered this defense late in his career.

The Old Indian is considered sound, though developing the bishop at e7 is less  than the fianchetto, and it has never attained the popularity of the King's Indian. Some King's Indian players will use the Old Indian to avoid certain anti-King's Indian systems, such as the Sämisch and Averbakh Variations.

The opening is classified in the Encyclopaedia of Chess Openings with the codes A53–A55.

Main line: 3.Nc3 e5 

The Main line is 3. Nc3 e5 4. Nf3 Nbd7 5. e4; White can also play 4.dxe5 dxe5 5.Qxd8+, but despite the displacement of Black's king, this has long been known  to offer no advantage, e.g. 5...Kxd8 6.Nf3 Nfd7, with Black often following up with some combination of ...c6, ...Kd8–c7, ...a5, ...Na6, and ...f6. Black's position is solid and their piece coordination is good; White's pawn exchange in the center has allowed Black equal  and freed the f8-bishop. 5... Be7 6. Be2 0-0 7. 0-0 c6 8. Re1 (or 8.Be3) and White stands slightly better.

Janowski Variation: 3.Nc3 Bf5 

The Janowski Variation, 3. Nc3 Bf5, was first introduced by Dawid Janowski in the 1920s. The idea behind it is that 3...Bf5 prevents White from immediately grabbing space with 4.e4. The variation did not gain much popularity until the 1980s. Several top-level players have employed the line multiple times, including Mikhail Tal, Bent Larsen, Florin Gheorghiu, and Kamran Shirazi.

3.Nf3
Or via the transposition 2.Nf3 d6 3.c4. Now: 
 3...Bg4 is suggested by De Firmian. (Tartakower-Indian variation)
 3...c6 (Czech Variation) and 3...Bf5 are possible. 
 3...g6 will likely transpose to the King's Indian Defence.
 3...Nbd7 4.Nc3 will likely transpose to the Main line.

See also
 List of chess openings

Further reading

Chess openings